is a Japanese clan which originates in Tōtōmi Province. It was a retainer clan of the Imagawa family, and then switched sides to the Matsudaira clan of Mikawa Province at the reign of Ii Naotora. A famed 16th-century clan member, Ii Naomasa, adopted son of Ii Naotora, was Tokugawa Ieyasu's son-in-law and one of his most important generals. He received the fief of Hikone in Ōmi Province as a reward for his conduct in battle at Sekigahara. The Ii and a few sub-branches remained daimyō for the duration of the Edo period. Ii Naosuke, the famed politician of the late Edo period, was another member of this clan.

The clan claims descent from Fujiwara no Yoshikado,  who had been one of the Daijō daijin during the ninth century.

Head Family
 Ii Tomoyasu (1010-1093)
 Ii Tomomune
 Ii Munetsuna
 Ii Tomofumi
 Ii Tomoie
 Ii Tomonao
 Ii Korenao
 Ii Morinao
 Ii Yoshinao
 Ii Yanonao
 Ii Yasunao
 Ii Yukinao (1309-1354)
 Ii Kagenao
 Ii Tadanao
 Ii Naouji
 Ii Naohira
 Ii Naomune
 Ii Naomori
 Ii Naochika
 Ii Naotora
 Ii Naomasa
 Ii Naokatsu
 Ii Naotaka
 Ii Naozumi (1625-1676)
 Ii Naooki (1656-1717)
 Ii Naomichi (1689-1710)
 Ii Naotsune (1693-1710)
 Ii Naooki (second time;1656-1717)
 Ii Naonobu (1700-1736)
 Ii Naosada (1700-1760)
 Ii Naoyoshi (1727-1754)
 Ii Naosada (second time;1700-1760)
 Ii Naohide (1729-1789)
 Ii Naonaka (1766-1831)
 Ii Naoaki (1794-1850)
 Ii Naosuke
 Ii Naonori
 Ii Naotada (1881-1947)
 Ii Naoyoshi (1910-1993)
 Ii Naohide
 Ii Takeo (b.1969)

Family members
 Ii Naohira (井伊 直平, 1479?–1563)
 Ii Naomori (井伊 直盛, 1526–1560)
 Ii Naomune (井伊 直宗, ?–1542)
 Ii Naomitsu  (井伊 直満, ?–1545)
 Ii Naochika (井伊 直親, 1535–1563)
 Ii Naoyoshi (井伊 直義, ?–1545)
 Ii Naotora (井伊 直虎, d. 1582)
 Ii Naomasa (井伊 直政, 1561–1602) 
 Tobai-in (唐梅院, d. 1639)
 Ii Naokatsu (井伊 直勝, 1590–1662)
 Ii Naotaka (井伊 直孝, 1590–1659)
 Ii Naoshige (井伊 直茂, 1612- July 5, 1661)
 Ii Naoharu (井伊 直春, April 25, 1719 – December 1, 1732)
 Ii Naosuke (井伊 直弼, November 29, 1815 – March 24, 1860)
 Ii Naonori  (井伊 直憲, May 22, 1848 – January 9, 1904)

Notes

References
 Papinot, Edmund. (1906) Dictionnaire d'histoire et de géographie du japon. Tokyo: Librarie Sansaisha.

External links

 Ii clan on "Buke-kaden"

 
Japanese clans